Microporus xanthopus is a species of fungus in the genus Microporus.

Gallery

References

Polyporaceae